Miellätno is a river in northern Sweden.

Rivers of Norrbotten County